De Klerk, Klerk, De Klerck or Klerck is surname of Dutch and Frisian origin.

De Klerk
 AJ de Klerk (born 1991), Namibian rugby player
 Bob de Klerk (born 1961), Dutch football player and manager
 Evette de Klerk (born 1965), South African sprinter
 Faf de Klerk (born 1991), South African rugby player
 Michel de Klerk (1884–1923), Dutch architect
 F. W. de Klerk (1936–2021), President of South Africa
 Jade de Klerk (born 1999), South African cricketer
 Jan de Klerk (1903–1979), South African politician, father of F.W.
 Jan de Klerk (rugby union) (born 1991), South African rugby player
 Marike de Klerk (1937–2001), South African politician, former wife of F.W. de Klerk
 Michel de Klerk (1884–1923), Dutch architect
 Nadine de Klerk (born 2000), South African cricketer
 Peter de Klerk (1935–2015), South African racing driver 
 Rossouw de Klerk (born 1989), South African rugby player
 Thom de Klerk (1912-1966), Dutch bassoonist
 Veronica de Klerk (born 1947), Namibian women's rights activist

Fictional characters

Doctor Paulos de Klerk, a character in James Rollins and Grant Blackwood's novel The Kill Switch (2014)

Klerk 
 Barbara Klerk (born 1989), Belgian figure skater
 Sander Jan Klerk (born 1982), Dutch actor, singer

Klerck / de Klerck 
 Carl-Gustaf Klerck (1885–1976), Swedish Olympic fencer
 Hendrick de Klerck (c.1560–1630), Flemish painter 
 Reynier de Klerck (1710–1780), Governor-General of the Dutch East Indies

Dutch words and phrases
Dutch-language surnames
Afrikaans-language surnames
Occupational surnames